J. Augustus Smith, also known as Gus Smith (born January 14, 1891), was an American actor, playwright, and screenwriter. In 1936 he was one of three theatre artists who succeeded John Houseman in leading the Negro Theatre Unit of the Federal Theatre Project in New York City.

Biography 

Smith was born in Gainesville, Florida, in 1891. He made his stage debut during childhood, playing in minstrel shows.
In 1911, Smith formed his own minstrel company, with which he toured the United States. He went on to have a career in acting and writing for theatre and film.

Smith wrote and appeared in Drums O' Voodoo (1934). The film was based on his play Louisiana,  which premiered in 1933 on Broadway, starring Smith. The stage production featured an all-Black cast, members of the New Negro Repertory Theater Group, founded by Smith. The cast members reprised their roles for the film.

Smith co-wrote, co-directed, and co-starred in Turpentine, a play about conditions in turpentine camps in the American South, for the Federal Theatre Project. In 1936 he was one of a triumvirate of African-American theatre artists who succeeded John Houseman in leading the Negro Theatre Unit of the Federal Theatre Project.

Smith also wrote Just Ten Days, a folk-comedy that played at parks in the Bronx.

Smith and Oliver Foster had the lead roles in the theatrical production Walk Together Chillun.

Theatre
Louisiana (1933)
Turpentine (1936)
Walk Together Chillun (1936)
Just Ten Days (1937)
The Case of Philip Lawrence (1937), director
On Whitman Avenue (1946)

Filmography

Actor
Chloe Love Is Calling You (1934)
Drums O' Voodoo (1934)
Murder on Lenox Avenue  (1941) as Pa Wilkins 
Stolen Paradise (1941)
Sunday Sinners (1941)
Hi-De-Ho (1947 film) as Preacher
Junction 88 as Chinka Lin
Boarding House Blues (1948) as Norman Norman
Killer Diller as Stage Hand

Writer
Drums O' Voodoo (1934)

References

External links
 

1891 births
Year of death missing
Actors from Gainesville, Florida
Writers from Gainesville, Florida
20th-century African-American people
African-American actors
African-American writers
American dramatists and playwrights
Federal Theatre Project administrators